The following is a list of seasons played by the Colorado Rockies hockey franchise.

Season-by-season history
{| class="wikitable"
|bgcolor="#D0E7FF"|<small>'Stanley Cup Champions</small>
|bgcolor="#FFCCCC"|Presidents' Trophy
|bgcolor="#ddffdd"|Prince of Wales Trophy
|bgcolor="#FFE6BD"|Division Champions
|}

{| class="wikitable" style="text-align: center; font-size: 95%"
|-
!rowspan="2"|Season
!rowspan="2"|Team
!rowspan="2"|Conference
!rowspan="2"|Division
!colspan="8"|Regular season
!colspan="6"|Postseason
|-
!Finish
!GP
!W
!L
!T
!Pts
!GF
!GA
!GP
!W
!L
!GF
!GA
!Result
|-
! colspan="20" align="center" | Relocated from Kansas City|- bgcolor=black color=white
! align="center" colspan="19" | Colorado Rockies
|-
!1976–77
|1976–77
|Campbell
|Smythe
|5th
|80
|20
|46
|14
|54
|226
|307
| –
| –
| – 
| –
| –
| Did not qualify|-
!1977–78
|1977–78
|Campbell
|Smythe
|2nd
|80
|19
|40
|21
|59
|257
|305
| 2
| 0 
| 2 
| 3
| 6
| Lost in Preliminary Round vs. Philadelphia Flyers, 0–2
|-
!1978–79
|1978–79
|Campbell
|Smythe
|4th
|80
|15
|53
|12
|42
|210
|331
| –
| –
| – 
| –
| –
| Did not qualify|-
!1979–80
|1979–80
|Campbell
|Smythe
|6th
|80
|19
|48
|13
|51
|234
|308
| –
| –
| – 
| –
| –
| Did not qualify|-
!1980–81
|1980–81
|Campbell
|Smythe
|5th
|80
|22
|45
|13
|57
|258
|344
| –
| –
| – 
| –
| –
| Did not qualify|-
!1981–82
|1981–82
|Campbell
|Smythe
|5th
|80
|18
|49
|13
|49
|241
|362
| –
| –
| – 
| –
| –
| Did not qualify|-
! colspan="19" align="center" | Relocated to New Jersey''
|- style="font-weight:bold; background-color:#dddddd;" 
| colspan="5"| Totals
| 480
| 113
| 281
| 86
| 312
| 1426
| 1957
| 2
| 0
| 2
| 3
| 6
| 1 playoff appearance

Notes

 

seasons